This is a list of Baptist churches that are notable either as congregations or as buildings.

Australia

United Kingdom

England

See also List of Baptist churches in Leicester.

Wales

United States
There are numerous notable Baptist churches in the U.S., including many whose buildings are listed on the National Register of Historic Places.

Alabama

There are at least 36 notable Baptist churches in Alabama.

Arkansas

Arizona

California

Colorado

Connecticut

Delaware

District of Columbia

Florida

Georgia

Idaho

Indiana

Iowa

Kansas

Kentucky

Louisiana

Maine

Maryland

Massachusetts

Michigan

Minnesota

Mississippi

Missouri

Montana

Nebraska

New Hampshire

New Jersey

New Mexico

New York

North Carolina

North Dakota

Ohio

Oklahoma

Oregon

Pennsylvania

Rhode Island

South Carolina

South Dakota

Tennessee

There are many more NRHP-listed and other Baptist churches in Tennessee.

Texas

Utah

Vermont

Virginia

Washington

West Virginia

Wisconsin

Malaysia
 D'Gap Baptist Church Located in Kota Kinabalu, Sabah, Malaysia.

South Africa

Other Baptist related entities and buildings

Primitive Baptist churches

There are several Primitive Baptist churches in the U.S.

References

Baptist